Kedu Residency (also known as Kedoe and Kedoo) was a colonial administrative unit in Central Java in Java, Indonesia.

It contained the areas which are now the Kebumen, Wonosobo, Temanggung, Purworejo and Magelang regencies (including Magelang city).  All of the areas under the residency were under the Surakarta Sunanate, until the Indonesian government abolished its recognition of the monarchy. It was adjacent to the Banyumas (to the west), and Semarang (to the north) residencies.

References
 Sutherland, Heather (1979) The Making of a Bureaucratic Elite – The Colonial Transformation of the Javanese Priyayi Singapore Heineman
  map on p. xiii, and list on p. xii

See also
 List of regencies and cities of Indonesia

Central Java
Residencies of the Dutch East Indies